was the eldest son of Japanese Emperor Richū; and he was the father of sons who would become known as Emperor Kenzō and Emperor Ninken.  

No firm dates can be assigned to the lives or reigns of this period, but the reign of Emperor Ankō is considered to have lasted from 456 to 479; and Oshiwa died during Ankō's reign.

Traditional history 
According to the Nihonshoki, Oshiwa was killed in a hunting accident by Emperor Yūryaku. His sons were adopted as heirs by Emperor Seinei. They are known as Prince Woke (or Kenzō-tennō) and as Prince Oke (or Ninken-tennō).

References 

5th-century births
5th-century deaths
Japanese princes
People of Kofun-period Japan
Sons of emperors